Cupang is a barangay in the Muntinlupa, Philippines. It has a population of 57,013. It is located in the Northern section of the city.

Buli is located south of the City of Manila. It is bounded on the north by the Muntinlupa Barangay of Buli, on the south by the Muntinlupa barangays of Alabang and Ayala Alabang, on the west by the Parañaque barangay of BF Homes and the Las Piñas barangay of Almanza Uno, and on the east by Laguna de Bay.

History
Cupang is said to be named after the cupang tree that is abundant in the area. Parkia javanica or Cupang is a plant of the genus Parkia in the family Mimosaceae.

Subdivisions

While barangays are the administrative divisions of the city, and are legally part of the addresses of establishments and homes, residents also include their subdivision. Listed below are subdivisions in this barangay.

 Alabang 400
 Alabang Hills
 B.F. Homes Phase 4
 Capri Homes
 Embassy Village
 Hillsborough Homes
 Intercity Homes Subdivision
 Kalipayan Homes
 Liberty Homes
 Mintcor South Row Townhomes
 Pacific Village
 Pacific Malayan
 Rizal Village
 San Jose Subdivision
 Tierra Nueva Village
 Villa Donata

See also
 Sucat River
 Mangangate River

References

External links
http://muntinlupacity.gov.ph/
https://alabanghillsvillage.com

Muntinlupa
Barangays of Metro Manila